The Buffalo 716ers were a basketball team based in Buffalo, New York, they played in the PBL. The 716ers were originally granted an expansion team with the American Basketball Association., before joining the IBA.

The team takes its name from area code 716, the telephone area code for Buffalo and much of the rest of western New York. Home games were originally played at Tapestry Charter School. The team then played home games at the Burt Flickinger Center in downtown Buffalo. The team owner, and head coach, is Tawan Slaughter, a native of the Buffalo area.

The 716ers were the fourth minor league franchise to play in Buffalo, after the Buffalo Rapids (later known as the Silverbacks and Sharks), which played from 2005 to 2007, the Buffalo Stampede, which played from 2008 - 2011, and the Buffalo Warriors.

History

2012
In October 2012 the team held open tryouts allowing members of the public to work out and earn a spot on the team roster.

2013
During the summer of 2013 the 716ers played in the NBA-sanctioned Los Angeles Summer Pro League from July 23 to 29, 2013.

2014
The inaugural 2014 season began in January 2014. The Buffalo 716ers finished the season with the PBL with a six-game winning streak, leading to a 9–7 regular-season record. The 2014 season was played at the Thunder Dome at Tapestry Charter School in Buffalo, New York.

The season did not start out promising, with the 716ers standing at 1–7 at the midway point.  Those seven losses were the only ones the 716ers would see that season.

Going into the 2015 season the 716ers announced they were holding open tryouts on Saturday, September 13, 2014.

2015
The 716ers started the 2015 season with a 4–7 record. On February 14, 2015, the team's starting point guard, Amir Billups, was killed in a multi-car pile up in Morrow County, Ohio, at the age of 24. (Amir Billups is a second cousin of former NBA player Chauncey Billups.) A week later, the team dedicated their next game to Billups, beating the Philadelphia Flight at home by a score of 143–114. The following day, they also beat the Erie Hurricane and improved their record to 6–7.

Relaunch

In June 2018, the 716ers' official Facebook page announced  that the team would be returning for the 2018-2019 season, in a new venue.

Notable players
 Charles Vanderpool

References

External links
Official Buffalo 716ers Website
Buffalo 716ers Granted ABA Expansion Team for 2013
Buffalo 716ers Announced As New ABA Team
Los Angeles Summer Pro League
Buffalo 716ers join the PBL

Basketball teams in New York (state)
2012 establishments in New York (state)
Basketball teams established in 2012
Sports in Buffalo, New York
2015 disestablishments in New York (state)
Basketball teams disestablished in 2015